Multiple inositol polyphosphate phosphatase 1 is an enzyme that in humans is encoded by the MINPP1 gene.

MINPP1 hydrolyzes the abundant metabolites inositol pentakisphosphate and inositol hexakisphosphate and, like PTEN (MIM 601728), has the ability to remove 3-phosphate from inositol phosphate substrates.[supplied by OMIM]

References

Further reading